Delphinatia is a genus of air-breathing land snails, terrestrial pulmonate gastropod mollusks in the family Helicidae, the typical snails.

Species
 Delphinatia fontenillii (Michaud, 1829)
 Delphinatia glacialis (A. Férussac, 1832)

References

 Groenenberg D.S.J., Subai P. & Gittenberger E. (2016). Systematics of Ariantinae (Gastropoda, Pulmonata, Helicidae), a new approach to an old problem. Contributions to Zoology. 85(1): 37–65.